Yevgeni Borisovich Yefremov (born 30 June 1970) is a Russian professional football coach and a former player.

Club career
He made his professional debut in the Soviet Second League in 1988 for FC Torpedo Naberezhnye Chelny. He played six games in the UEFA Intertoto Cup 1996 for FC KAMAZ-Chally Naberezhnye Chelny.

References

1970 births
Footballers from Kazan
Living people
Soviet footballers
Russian footballers
Association football defenders
Russian Premier League players
FC KAMAZ Naberezhnye Chelny players
FC Rubin Kazan players
Russian football managers
FC KAMAZ Naberezhnye Chelny managers
FC Neftekhimik Nizhnekamsk players